Anastrangalia sanguinolenta is a species of flower longhorn beetles belonging to the family Cerambycidae, subfamily Lepturinae.

This beetle is a common species present in most of Europe and in the Near Eastern countries such as Caucasus, Transcaucasia, and Turkey, where they mainly inhabit mountainous coniferous forests.

Head, antennae and pronotum are black in both sexes, while elytra are reddish-brown in the female and yellowish-brown in the male.

The larvae develop at the expense of various species of conifers, mainly within dead wood of Pinus sylvestris and Picea abies. The adults visit flowers for nectar and pollen.

References

External links
Fauna Europaea

Lepturinae
Beetles of Europe
Beetles described in 1761
Taxa named by Carl Linnaeus